Clifford George Melton (January 3, 1912 – July 28, 1986) was an American professional baseball left-handed pitcher, who played in Major League Baseball (MLB) for the New York Giants over parts of eight seasons spanning 1937–44.

A native of Brevard, North Carolina, Melton had two different nicknames: "Mickey Mouse" and "Mountain Music". His cousin, Rube, pitched in the major leagues for six seasons.

Major League career
Melton enjoyed his best year in his rookie season of 1937, when he had a record of 20–9 with a 2.61 earned run average (ERA) and topped the National League (NL) with seven saves, helping the Giants won the NL pennant before losing to the New York Yankees in the 1937 World Series. Melton also was named to the National League All-Star team in 1942.

For his career, Melton posted an 86–80 record with a 3.42 ERA in 272 pitching appearances (179 starts), and striking out 660 batters while walking 431 in  innings of work. In World Series play, he went 0–2 with a 4.91 ERA in three games (two starts), including seven strikeouts and six walks in 11 innings.

Melton died on July 28, 1986, in Baltimore, Maryland, at the age of 74.

Fact
On September 15, 1938, Melton was on the mound the first time that two brothers hit back-to-back home runs in major league history. The batters were Lloyd Waner and Paul Waner of the Pittsburgh Pirates. (The second time was not until April 23, 2013, when B. J. Upton and Justin Upton of the Atlanta Braves homered against Colorado Rockies' Jon Garland.)

See also
 List of Major League Baseball annual saves leaders

References

External links

1912 births
1986 deaths
People from Brevard, North Carolina
Americus-Cordele Orioles players
Asheville Tourists players
Baltimore Orioles (IL) players
Baseball players from North Carolina
Beaumont Roughnecks players
Binghamton Triplets players
Erie Sailors players
Harlan Smokies players
Jersey City Giants players
Kansas City Blues (baseball) players
Major League Baseball pitchers
Minor league baseball managers
National League All-Stars
Navegantes del Magallanes players
American expatriate baseball players in Venezuela
New York Giants (NL) players
Newark Bears (IL) players
San Francisco Seals (baseball) players